The Leão River is a river of Santa Catarina state in southeastern Brazil. It is a tributary of Canoas or Sertão branch river.

See also
List of rivers of Santa Catarina

References

Rivers of Santa Catarina (state)